The 2019 AFC Women's Club Championship was the first edition of the Asia's women's club football competition organised by AFC, held in South Korea between 26 and 30 November 2019. Four clubs from four associations competed in this edition, which was also known as 2019 FIFA–AFC Pilot Women's Club Championship.

Teams
The following teams qualified for the tournament.

Venue
All matches were played at Yongin Citizen Sports Park, Yongin.

Format
Teams played in a single round-robin.

Standings

Matches
All times are local KST (UTC+9).

Goalscorers

See also 
 2019–20 UEFA Women's Champions League
 2019 WAFF Women's Clubs Championship
 2019 Copa Libertadores Femenina
 2019 AFC Champions League

References

External links
, the-AFC.com
AFC Women's Club Championship 2019, stats.the-AFC.com

2019
2019 in women's association football
 Women's Club Championship
2019 in South Korean football
November 2019 sports events in South Korea
International club association football competitions hosted by South Korea